Priscilla Zuniga (born July 14, 1991), better known by the ring name Diamante, is a Cuban-American professional wrestler currently performing for All Elite Wrestling. She is also known for her time with Impact Wrestling and on the independent circuit under the ring name Angel Rose.

Professional wrestling career

Independent circuit (2008–present) 
Zuniga wrestled on the independent circuit under the ring name Angel Rose, primarily working for Independent Championship Wrestling in Florida, where she is a four-time ICW Women's Champion as well as a winner of the ICW Hard Knocks Championship and the ICW Championship. She also worked for various other Florida-based promotions such as IGNITE Wrestling, RONIN Pro Wrestling, and Shine Wrestling. Zuniga made an appearance on the March 22, 2017, episode of NXT, working under her real name as an enhancement talent in a quick loss to Asuka.

Zuniga joined Women of Wrestling (WOW) in July 2019 where she performs under the ring name Adrenaline. Adrenaline teamed with Fire in the tag team tournament for the vacant WOW Tag Team Championship in which they won in the second season finale on AXS TV on May 16, which aired on tape delay on November 23.

On September 5, 2019, Diamante made her debut for Empower Wrestling and defeated Gemma Cross in first round to determine Empower Wrestling's first champion.

However, she was defeated by Nicole Savoy on September 26, 2019, and was eliminated in the semi-final of the tournament.

Impact Wrestling (2017–2019) 
Zuniga joined Impact Wrestling as part of The Latin American Xchange in March 2017, and made her debut along with the rest of the group on the March 23 episode of Impact Wrestling under the ring name Diamante. On the April 6 episode of Impact Wrestling, Diamante made her in-ring debut, participating in a gauntlet match to become number one contender for the Impact Wrestling Knockouts Championship, but was eliminated by Brandi Rhodes. During their feud with Alberto El Patron, she and Homicide (LAX) beat El Hijo on July 20. In July 2017, Diamante suffered a knee injury and underwent surgery to repair her left ACL and was out of action for the rest of the year. She returned to Impact on the August 25, 2018 episode of Xplosion in a match against Su Yung, but then was released on January 28, 2019.

In the spring of 2019, Diamante fully recovered from her injury and began wrestling on the American independent scene again.

All Elite Wrestling (2020–present) 
Diamante made her in-ring debut on the 16th episode of AEW Dark on January 15, 2020.  The event, on the campus of the University of Miami Hurricanes, was a singles match between herself and Big Swole, which she lost. Diamante  made her AEW Dynamite debut on July 22, 2020 with a win over Ivelisse. This victory would earn her a non-title match against the AEW Women's Champion Hikaru Shida, however, Diamante was unsuccessful.

Diamante would begin teaming with Ivelisse in the AEW Women's Tag Team Cup Tournament after they were paired together in The Deadly Draw. The team would advance to the finals after defeating Rachael Ellering and Dasha Gonzalez in the first round, and Tay Conti and Anna Jay in the semi-finals. They would ultimately win the tournament defeating The Nightmare Sisters (Allie and Brandi Rhodes) in the finals. Diamante and Ivelisse would again team up on the November 24, 2020 episode of Dark, defeating Lady Frost and "Bionic Beast" Jenna.

Work outside of wrestling 
She played the part of Ava Hernandez in Len Kabasinski's 2022 film Pact of Vengeance which also stars Leo Fong.

Personal life 
On July 20, 2019, it was announced that Diamante is in a relationship with fellow professional wrestler Kiera Hogan.

Diamante's younger brother is also a professional wrestler, performing as KC Navarro.

Championships and accomplishments 
All Elite Wrestling
AEW Women's Tag Team Cup (2020) – with Ivelisse
 Independent Championship Wrestling
 ICW Championship (1 time)
 ICW Hard Knocks Championship (1 time)
 ICW Women's Championship (4 times)
Queens of Combat
QOC Championship (1 time)
 Women of Wrestling
 WOW Tag Team Championship (1 time) – with Fire
 WOW Tag Team Championship Tournament (2019) – with Fire

References

External links 

1990 births
Living people
All Elite Wrestling personnel
American female professional wrestlers
Cuban female professional wrestlers
American sportspeople of Cuban descent
LGBT Hispanic and Latino American people
LGBT professional wrestlers
LGBT people from Florida
People from Miami Gardens, Florida
Professional wrestlers from Florida
Sportspeople from Miami-Dade County, Florida
21st-century American LGBT people
21st-century American women
21st-century professional wrestlers